Kelvin José Caña Infante (sometimes spelt Kelvin Cañas; born August 6, 1987) is a Venezuelan épée fencer, individual bronze medallist at the 2014 Pan American Fencing Championships and team gold medallist at the 2016 Pan American Fencing Championships. He competed in the 2016 Summer Olympics men's team épée event as a reserve.

References 

1987 births
Living people
Venezuelan male épée fencers
Olympic fencers of Venezuela
Fencers at the 2016 Summer Olympics
People from Ciudad Bolívar
21st-century Venezuelan people